The ruki sound law, also known as the ruki rule or iurk rule, is a historical sound change that took place in the satem branches of the Indo-European language family, namely in Balto-Slavic, Armenian, and Indo-Iranian.

  >  / } _

In the second stage, leveling of the sibilant system resulted in retroflexion (cf. Sanskrit ष  and Proto-Slavic), and later retraction to velar  in Slavic and some Middle Indic languages. This rule was first formulated by Holger Pedersen, and it is sometimes known as Pedersen's law, although this term is also applied to another sound law concerning stress in the Balto-Slavic languages.

The name "ruki" comes from the sounds (r, u, K, i) which triggered the sound change. The law is stated as a mnemonic rule because the word ruki means hands or arms in many Slavic languages or genitive of a single form (as in "rule of hand").

Applications to language groups
The rule was originally formulated for Sanskrit. It was later proposed to be valid in some degree for all satem languages, and exceptionless for the Indo-Iranian languages. (There appears to be one exception at least in some Nuristani languages, however.) In Baltic and Albanian, it is limited or affected to a greater or lesser extent by other sound laws. Nevertheless, it has to have been universal in these branches of the IE languages, and the lack of Slavic reflexes before consonants is due rather to their merger with the reflexes of other sibilants.

Exceptions in Slavic languages
In Slavic languages the process is regular before a vowel, but it does not take place before consonants. This velar fricative changed back into  before a front vowel or the palatal approximant .

Exceptions in Indo-Iranian languages
In Indo-Iranian *r and *l merged, and the change worked even after the new sound; e.g. Avestan karš-, Sanskrit  kárṣati 'to plough' < PIE . This has been cited as evidence by many scholars as an argument for the later influence of Iranian languages on Proto-Slavic. There are obvious drawbacks in the theory. First, the two sounds must have been very close (r/l), so that both could have triggered the change in Indo-Iranian. Second, there are no real examples of this change working in Slavic, and it is also doubtful that only this change (ruki) and no other such change of sibilants (e.g.  > h) was borrowed into Slavic.

The syllabic laryngeal *H̥ becomes *i in Proto-Indo-Iranian, and this also triggered RUKI.

A later extension of RUKI was particular to the Iranian languages: *s, *z shift to *š, *ž also after the labial stops *p, *b, including even secondary *s from Proto-Indo-Iranian *ć < PIE *ḱ.

Nuristani
The Ruki rule also displays a rather different behavior in Nuristani, conditioned by the following factors:

 The reflex of the Proto-Indo-European sequence *ḱs is Nuristani *c (pronounced [t͡s]), the same as that of plain *ḱ, thus in this context there is no evidence of the operation of RUKI. E.g. the word for 'bear', reflecting Proto-Indo-European *h₂ŕ̥tk̂os (Sanskrit rkṣa "bear", Avestan arša) shows a dental affricate in most Nuristani languages as ic or oc.
 Proto-Indo-European sequences *ks and *kʷs become Nuristani *č. Thus Proto-Indo-European *ksu-ró "razor" reflects as kṣurá in Sanskrit, and churi ("sickle") in Kati, and čūr ("large knife") in Waigali.
 Various cases where the Ruki law failed to operate after *i and *u in Nuristani exist. Hegedűs notes that these all seem to trace back to PIE etyma where the *us and *is sequences were earlier *uHs and *iHS, meaning the laryngeals seem to have blocked the operation of Ruki. For example, PIE *muHs "mouse" > Sanskrit mūṣ-, Avestan mūš, but Kati mussā, Prasun mǖsu, while the Waigali word is of dubious etymology, and the Ashkun form shows a variation in articulation due to secondary phenomena.
 Proto-Indo-European *rs and *ls merge into a Nuristani *ṣ, thus after *r we do actually see proper Ruki-like behavior in Nuristani.

Albanian
According to Orel (2000: 62), Albanian shows a limited RUKI-like development, where *s becomes sh only after PIE *y, *w (including their vocalic counterparts *i, *u). E.g.
 lesh 'wool, fleece, hair' < *laysa, cf. Slavic *listъ 'leaf' < *leys-to-
 dash 'ram' < *dawsa, cf. Germanic *deuzą < *dʰews-om
 pishë 'pine' < *pisā, cf. Latin pīnus 'pine' < *pi(t)snos
 prush 'ember' < *prusa, cf. Latin prūna 'ember' < *prusnā; Sanskrit ploṣati 'to burn' < *prews-
This differs from the development of *rs, *ks, and of *s after other vowels, e.g.
 djerr 'fallow land' < *dersa, cf. Greek χέρσος 'dry land' < *ǵʰers-
 hirrë 'whey' < *ksirā, cf. Sanskrit क्षीर / kṣīrá 'milk'
 kohë 'time' < *kāsā, cf. Slavic *časъ 'time' < *kʷeh₁s-eh₂

However, this view of Albanian is controversial. Firstly, the words in question that Orel bases this theory on have shaky etymologies. Dash has a disputed etymology, with rival versions attributing the word not to Proto-Indo-European *dʰews-om but instead *dʰeh₁-l-, or *demh₂ from *dmh₂ "to tame". Pishë meanwhile is argued to not be inherited from Proto-Indo-European at all; rather it and its soundalikes in Greek and Latin are in fact substrate vocabulary. Lesh is alternatively attributed instead to *h₂welh₁- "wool", making it cognate to Latin vellus. 

Meanwhile, no RUKI-like rule is included in other studies of Proto-Albanian diachrony. Michiel de Vaan (2015) instead has a Proto-Albanian *ʃ emerging from different means, which barely resemble a RUKI law: Indo-European *ks shares the fate of simple *s in becoming *ʃ before *t (as occurred for jashtë "outside" and gjashtë "six", but not other cases with *ks where *t did not follow), with *t as the conditioning factor, rather than the prior *k. Meanwhile, the development of *s itself is highly disputed, but in contrast to Orel's view that it was conditioned on a RUKI-like phenomenon, De Vaan prefers Kortlandt's view that *s became *ʃ when either followed by an unstressed vowel or intervocalically, regardless of the quality of nearby vowels.

Notes

Further reading
 Charles Prescott. "Germanic and the Ruki Dialects"

Indo-European linguistics
Sound laws